An Online Writing Lab (OWL) is often an extension of a university writing center. Online writing labs offer help to students and other writers by providing literacy materials, such as handouts and slide presentations. Writers may also submit questions electronically for feedback. Many OWLs are open to people unaffiliated with the specific institution. Online writing labs play an important part in writing center assistance by allowing writers to use some of the center's resources remotely.

Purdue University, in West Lafayette, Indiana, launched the first OWL, in 1994. Its OWL is freely available online to all, and includes handouts, specific subject information, resources geared towards students in grades 7-12, and citation formatting help with MLA, APA and other forms.

OWL history
In 1976, the Department of English at Purdue University asked Muriel "Mickey" Harris to establish a writing lab, a campus-based service designed to assist learners in their rhetorical writing processes. Harris began the writing lab by collaborating with a team of graduate assistants, who worked one-to-one with student writers,  often authoring handouts to reinforce lessons in the writing lab. Harris and the tutors sent paper copies of their materials to individuals beyond Purdue University who had contacted the writing lab, requesting information on writing, citation, or research; these resources later became available electronically, through email requests and through GOPHER (a precursor to the World Wide Web), in 1993. Harris and the Purdue Writing Lab launched its OWL on the web, in 1995, then among the first OWLs on the Internet. Having made its library of resources available electronically, the Purdue OWL became accessible to millions of users worldwide.

References

External links
 The International Writing Center Association's list of OWLs

1994 establishments in Indiana
Academia
Composition (language)
Computer-related introductions in 1994
Purdue University